Hunx and His Punx is an American punk band from San Francisco, California.

History

Origins 

Hunx, real name Seth Bogart, started the band in 2008 after years of performing in a pop group called Gravy Train!!!! The group's sound has been compared to girl groups and is a mix of punk and bubblegum music. The band played its first national tour of the United States alongside Jay Reatard and Nobunny in 2009. The band officially released its debut singles compilation album Gay Singles in 2010 on True Panther Sounds in the U.S. and Born Bad in France.

New line-up 

In January 2010, Hunx began a tour featuring an all-girl backing band. The new line-up has been identified on the tour and in new songs such as "Lovers Lane" as Hunx and His Punkettes.

In March 2010, the band played in a tribute concert for the recently deceased Jay Reatard. In May 2010, LensCrafters began airing a commercial featuring a short audio clip of "Gimmie Gimmie Back Your Love." In October 2010, Hunx and His Punx signed to Hardly Art. The band's debut album for the label, Too Young to Be in Love, was released in April 2011. It was produced in New York City by Ivan Julian of Richard Hell and The Voidoids.

Breakup 

In June 2011, Hunx announced that they would be playing their last show with the "Punkettes" due to Hunx and His Punx guitarists Amy Blaustein and Michelle Santamaria quitting. He then moved to Los Angeles.

In February 2012, Hunx released a solo album titled Hairdresser Blues on Hardly Art. In 2016, he released his second solo album Seth Bogart under his birth name on Burger, featuring collaborations from Kathleen Hanna and Tavi Gevinson.

Reunion 

Hunx and His Punx now consists of Seth Bogart, Shannon Shaw, and Erin Emslie. They released Street Punk in 2013 and toured with a new guitarist Nik Johnson. In 2014, they released a greatest hits album for the Japanese leg of their Street Punk tour.

Discography

Studio albums 
 Too Young to Be in Love, Hardly Art, 2011
 Street Punk, Hardly Art, 2013
 Greatest Hits, Violet and Claire (Japan), 2014

Singles 
 "Gimmie Gimmie Back Your Love", Rob's House, 2009
 "Good Kisser" / "Cruisin" Single, Bachelor Records, 2009
 "Hey Rocky", Bubbledumb, 2010
 "Teardrops on My Telephone", Shattered, 2010
 "Don't Cha Want Me Back?", True Panther Sounds, 2010
 "Pink Christmas" with SSION and Samantha Urbani, 2014

Compilations 
 Gay Singles, True Panther Sounds, 2010

References

External links 
 
 

Punk rock groups from California
Garage punk groups
Queercore groups
Musical groups established in 2008
Musical groups from San Francisco
LGBT-themed musical groups
Garage rock groups from California
Hardly Art artists
2008 establishments in California